Leciophysma is a genus of cyanolichens in the family Pannariaceae. It has four species. The genus was circumscribed by Theodor Magnus Fries in 1865, with Leciophysma finmarkicum assigned as the type species.

Species
Leciophysma finmarkicum 
Leciophysma parvum 
Leciophysma saximontanum 
Leciophysma subantarcticum 

The species once known as Leciophysma fennicum  is now Lempholemma intricatum.

References

Peltigerales
Lichen genera
Peltigerales genera
Taxa named by Theodor Magnus Fries
Taxa described in 1865